Estadio San Sebastian is a football stadium in Pasaquina, El Salvador. It is the ground of C.D. Pasaquina from 2005 to present.
The stadium holds 5000 seats. 

Football venues in El Salvador